In combinatorics, a Sperner family (or Sperner system; named in honor of Emanuel Sperner), or clutter, is a family F of subsets of a finite set E in which none of the sets contains another.  Equivalently, a Sperner family is an antichain in the inclusion lattice over the power set of E.  A Sperner family is also sometimes called an independent system or irredundant set.

Sperner families are counted by the Dedekind numbers, and their size is bounded by Sperner's theorem and the Lubell–Yamamoto–Meshalkin inequality. They may also be described in the language of hypergraphs rather than set families, where they are called clutters.

Dedekind numbers

The number of different Sperner families on a set of n elements is counted by the Dedekind numbers, the first few of which are
2, 3, 6, 20, 168, 7581, 7828354, 2414682040998, 56130437228687557907788 .
Although accurate asymptotic estimates are known for larger values of n, it is unknown whether there exists an exact formula that can be used to compute these numbers efficiently.

The collection of all Sperner families on a set of n elements can be organized as a free distributive lattice, in which the join of two Sperner families is obtained from the union of the two families by removing sets that are a superset of another set in the union.

Bounds on the size of a Sperner family

Sperner's theorem 

The k-element subsets of an n-element set form a Sperner family, the size of which is maximized when k = n/2 (or the nearest integer to it).
Sperner's theorem states that these families are the largest possible Sperner families over an n-element set. Formally, the theorem states that, for every Sperner family S over an n-element set,

LYM inequality

The Lubell–Yamamoto–Meshalkin inequality provides another bound on the size of a Sperner family, and can be used to prove Sperner's theorem.
It states that, if ak denotes the number of sets of size k in a Sperner family over a set of n elements, then

Clutters
A clutter is a family of subsets of a finite set such that none contains any other; that is, it is a Sperner family.  The difference is in the questions typically asked.    Clutters are an important structure in the study of combinatorial optimization.

An opposite notion to a clutter is an abstract simplicial complex, where every subset of an edge is contained in the hypergraph; this is an order ideal in the poset of subsets of V.)

It can be shown that  , so blockers give us a type of duality. It is easy to see that .

Examples 
Kőnig's theorem states that, for bipartite graphs, . However for other graphs these two quantities may differ.
 Let G be a graph and let .
 Let G be a connected graph and let H be the clutter on  consisting of all edge sets of spanning trees of G.  Then  is the collection of all minimal edge cutsets in G.

Minors 
There is a minor relation on clutters which is similar to the minor relation on graphs. We contract v to get the clutter . These two operations commute, and if J is another clutter, we say that J is a minor of H if a clutter isomorphic to J may be obtained from H by a sequence of deletions and contractions.

References 
.
.
.
.

Families of sets